Sam Crowther (born 3 April 2000) is a Dutch professional footballer who plays as a forward for Victoria Rosport.

Career
Crowther was born in Groningen. After playing for Jong Groningen and ONS Sneek, he joined Go Ahead Eagles in summer 2020.

Career statistics

References

2000 births
Living people
Dutch footballers
Association football forwards
FC Groningen players
ONS Sneek players
Go Ahead Eagles players
Derde Divisie players
Eerste Divisie players
FC Victoria Rosport players
Luxembourg National Division players
Dutch expatriate footballers
Expatriate footballers in Luxembourg
Dutch expatriate sportspeople in Luxembourg
Dutch people of English descent